Moorhead Township is a township in Clay County, Minnesota, United States. The population was 442 at the 2000 census.

Moorhead Township was named for William G. Moorhead, a railroad official.

Geography
According to the United States Census Bureau, the township has a total area of 18.9 square miles (49.0 km), all land.

Demographics
As of the census of 2000, there were 442 people, 153 households, and 132 families residing in the township.  The population density was 23.3 people per square mile (9.0/km).  There were 160 housing units at an average density of 8.5/sq mi (3.3/km).  The racial makeup of the township was 99.10% White, 0.23% Asian, and 0.68% from two or more races. Hispanic or Latino of any race were 0.23% of the population.

There were 153 households, out of which 31.4% had children under the age of 18 living with them, 77.8% were married couples living together, 5.2% had a female householder with no husband present, and 13.7% were non-families. 7.8% of all households were made up of individuals, and 3.9% had someone living alone who was 65 years of age or older.  The average household size was 2.89 and the average family size was 3.04.

In the township the population was spread out, with 24.9% under the age of 18, 6.8% from 18 to 24, 28.7% from 25 to 44, 28.3% from 45 to 64, and 11.3% who were 65 years of age or older.  The median age was 40 years. For every 100 females, there were 114.6 males.  For every 100 females age 18 and over, there were 115.6 males.

The median income for a household in the township was $54,286, and the median income for a family was $61,125. Males had a median income of $40,357 versus $23,750 for females. The per capita income for the township was $27,591.  None of the families and 1.0% of the population were living below the poverty line, including no under eighteens and none of those over 64.

References

Townships in Clay County, Minnesota
Townships in Minnesota